Sir John Cowan, 1st Baronet (1774 – 22 October 1842) was a prosperous London chandler and Lord Mayor of London.

An alderman of Broad St Ward from 1831, he was also appointed Sheriff of the City of London for 1831 and elected Lord Mayor for 1837–38. In his year as Lord Mayor he hosted a visit of Queen Victoria to London and was made a baronet on 9 November 1837 in thanks.

He married Sophia, the daughter of James Mullett; they had no children. He died at his home in Forest Hill, south London on 22 October 1842, aged 68, and was buried in the catacombs of West Norwood Cemetery.

References

Sheriffs of the City of London
19th-century lord mayors of London
19th-century English politicians
Baronets in the Baronetage of the United Kingdom
1774 births
1842 deaths
Burials at West Norwood Cemetery
19th-century British businesspeople